The Wasigny–Mézières railway was a  long narrow gauge and metre gauge railway line in the north of France, which was put into service in sections from 1897 and operated until 1948.

Route 
The secondary railway line of the Chemins de fer départementaux des Ardennes ran from Wasigny via Signy-l'Abbaye to Mézières in walking distance to the Mohon(fr) und Charleville-Mézières stations.

History 
The Wasigny–Signy section was opened in 1897 as a narrow-gauge railway with the unusual gauge of 800 mm for military reasons, and was only converted to metre gauge when the metre-gauge Signy–Mézières section was built, which opened in 1908. The railway operated until 1948.

Stations

References 

Railway lines in Grand Est
800 mm gauge railways
Metre gauge railways in France
Chemins de fer départementaux des Ardennes